The year 2017 in architecture involved some significant architectural events and new buildings.

Events
January 19 – The Plasco Building in Tehran (Iran) collapses during a fire.
May – The Fogarty Building, a "mammoth of modern Brutalist architecture" in Providence, Rhode Island built in the 1960s and abandoned since 2003, is demolished to make room for a hotel
June 14 – The Grenfell Tower fire in London forces major reviews of public housing tower block construction in the United Kingdom
November 15–17 – The annual World Architecture Festival is held in Berlin.

Buildings and structures

Belgium
May 25 – NATO headquarters in Haren, Brussels, designed by Skidmore, Owings & Merrill, dedicated

Brazil
January – The Children's Village at the Canuanã School, Formoso do Araguaia, Tocantins, designed by Rosenbaum + Aleph Zero (Gustavo Utrabo and Pedro Duschenes), completed

China
October – Tianjin Binhai Library, designed by MVRDV, opened
December 2 – Sea World Culture and Arts Center in Shekou, designed by Fumihiko Maki, opened
Ping An Finance Centre in Shenzhen, the second tallest building in China and the 4th tallest building in the world, is completed

Germany
January 11 – Elbphilharmonie, a concert hall in Hamburg, Germany, designed by Herzog & de Meuron, opened
October 31 – Reconstruction of the baroque Garrison Church tower in Potsdam projected for completion on the 500th anniversary of Reformation Day

South Africa
September 22  – Zeitz Museum of Contemporary Art Africa in Cape Town, converted from a grain silo by Thomas Heatherwick, opened

Spain
Early – Món Casteller. The Human Towers Experience in Valls (Province of Tarragona): museum dedicated to Intangible Heritage of UNESCO: the castell
June 23 – Centro Botín de Arte y Cultura in Santander, designed by Renzo Piano, opens to the public

United Arab Emirates
November 11 – Louvre Abu Dhabi, an art museum in Abu Dhabi designed by Jean Nouvel, opened

United Kingdom
Early – West Court, Jesus College, Cambridge, designed by Niall McLaughlin Architects, first phase completed 
February – Berkshire House (private home) near Caversham, Reading, designed by Gregory Phillips Architects, completed
February 14 – Nucleus, Wick, Caithness, Scotland, designed by Reiach and Hall Architects, opened
March – Leatare Quad at Lady Margaret Hall, Oxford, designed by John Simpson Architects, completed
March 18 – Cohen Quad for Exeter College, Oxford, designed by Alison Brooks Architects, opened
May – Sibson Building, University of Kent, Canterbury, designed by Penoyre & Prasad, opened
May 16 – Big Data Institute, University of Oxford, designed by Make Architects, opened
June – NGS Macmillan Unit, Chesterfield Royal Hospital, designed by The Manser Practice, opened
June 29 – New entrance, courtyard and gallery for Victoria and Albert Museum in London designed by Amanda Levete's AL A
Summer – Black House (private home), Great Chart, Kent, designed by Andy Ramus (AR Design Studio), completed
September 27 – GlaxoSmithKline Carbon Neutral Laboratory, University of Nottingham, designed by Fairhursts Design Group, opened
October 18 – Sultan Nazrin Shah Centre at Worcester College, Oxford, designed by Níall McLaughlin Architects, opened
October 24 – Bloomberg London European headquarters, designed by Foster and Partners, opened; awarded 2018 Stirling Prize
October 28 – Lombard Wharf (residential tower), Battersea, London, designed by Patel Taylor, completed
November 1 – New (sunken) library, The Queen's College, Oxford, designed by Rick Mather Architects, opened
December 13 – New Embassy of the United States, London, designed by KieranTimberlake, opened to public
15 Clerkenwell Close, London, designed by Amin Taha for himself, completed
Baltimore Tower in London Docklands designed by Skidmore, Owings & Merrill
Caring Wood (private home), Leeds, Kent, designed by James Macdonald Wright of Macdonald Wright Architects and Niall Maxwell, completed
Redesdale (private home), Boars Hill, Oxford, designed by Khoury Architects, completed
No. 37 (private home), Belfast, Northern Ireland, designed by Family Architects
Vex House, Stoke Newington, London, designed by Chance De Silva
Two Fifty One, a mixed-use development in Elephant and Castle, London, designed by Allies and Morrison, completed
Bushey Cemetery for United Synagogue, designed by Waugh Thistleton, completed

United States
Spring - The John W. Olver Design Building at the University of Massachusetts Amherst in Amherst, Massachusetts designed by Leers Weinzapfel Associates opens
April – Apple Park in Cupertino, California, designed by Norman Foster, opens
October 20 – Engineering Research Center, Brown University, designed by KieranTimberlake, opens
November – Museum of the Bible in Washington D.C., designed by David Greenbaum, opens

Exhibitions
April 25 until July 30 - "Berlin/Los Angeles: Space for Music" at the Getty Research Institute in Los Angeles, California.

Awards
AIA Gold Medal – Paul Revere Williams 
Architecture Firm Award AIA – Leddy Maytum Stacy Architects
Carbuncle Cup – PLP Architecture
Driehaus Architecture Prize for New Classical Architecture – Robert Adam
Emporis Skyscraper Award – Lotte World Tower
European Union Prize for Contemporary Architecture (Mies van der Rohe Prize) – NL Architects and XVW architectuur
Lawrence Israel Prize – Karim Rashid
Praemium Imperiale Architecture Laureate – Rafael Moneo
Pritzker Architecture Prize – Rafael Aranda, Carme Pigem, and Ramón Vilalta / RCR Arquitectes
RAIA Gold Medal – Peter Elliott
RIBA Royal Gold Medal – Paulo Mendes da Rocha, Brazil
RIBA Stirling Prize – dRMM Architects
Thomas Jefferson Medal in Architecture – Yvonne Farrell and Shelley McNamara
Twenty-five Year Award AIA – Grand Louvre—Phase I by Pei Cobb Freed & Partners
UIA Gold Medal – Toyo Ito
Vincent Scully Prize – Laurie Olin

Deaths

January 5 – Leonardo Benevolo, Italian architectural historian (b. 1923)
March 5 – Leonard Manasseh, British architect (b. 1916)
March 7 – Slavko Brezovski, Macedonian architect (b. 1922)
March 10 – Christopher Gray, American journalist and architectural historian (b. 1950)
March 17 – Hugh Hardy, American architect (b. 1932)
April 1 – Antonio Lamela, Spanish architect (b. 1926)
May 2 – Diane Lewis, American architect, author and academic (b. 1951)
July 1 – Richard Gilbert Scott, English architect (b. 1923)
July 4 – Bryan Avery, English architect (b. 1944)
August 15 – Gunnar Birkerts, 92, Latvian-born American architect (b. 1925)
September 1 – Gin D. Wong, 94, Chinese-born American architect (b. 1922)
September 9 – Otto Meitinger, 90, German architect and preservationist (b. 1929)
September 15 – Albert Speer Jr., 83, German architect (b. 1934)
September 28 – Vann Molyvann, 90, Cambodian architect (b. 1926)
October 5 – Dan Hanganu, 78, Romanian born Canadian architect (b. 1939)
October 29 – Manfredi Nicoletti, 89, Italian architect (b.1930)
November 30 – Vincent Scully, 97,r American architectural historian (b. 1920)
December 29 – John C. Portman Jr., American architect (Peachtree Center) (b. 1924)

See also
Timeline of architecture

References

 
21st-century architecture
2017-related lists